The Queen was an English automobile produced from 1904 to 1905.  "The car for the million or the millionaire", it was sold by Horner & Sons of Mitre Square, London.  Models of 12 and 16 hp were offered; prices ranged from 235 guineas to 275 guineas.

See also
 List of car manufacturers of the United Kingdom

References
David Burgess Wise, The New Illustrated Encyclopedia of Automobiles.

 Defunct motor vehicle manufacturers of England
1904 establishments in England
Cars of England
1905 disestablishments in England
Cars introduced in 1904
1900s in London
 British companies disestablished in 1905
 British companies established in 1904